Qaṣabah Ma'dabā is one of the districts  of Madaba governorate, Jordan.

References 

Districts of Jordan